DXXX may refer to:
 DXXX-AM, an AM radio station broadcasting in Zamboanga City
 DXXX-FM, an FM radio station broadcasting in Butuan City with the brand 100.7 iFM
 DXXX-TV, a TV station broadcasting in Zamboanga City with the brand CNN Philippines TV-5
 The ICAO code for Lomé–Tokoin Airport